Namina Forna (born 9 January 1987) is a Sierra Leonean American author of young adult fiction and a screenwriter. Her debut novel The Gilded Ones was published in February 2021 and quickly entered the New York Times and Indie Bestseller lists.

Early life
Namina Forna was born and grew up in Freetown, the capital of Sierra Leone. After her parents divorced, Forna's mother moved to Atlanta, Georgia. However, due to the looming civil war and general political instability in Sierra Leone, her father decided to also send his nine-year-old daughter to live with her mother in the United States.

Forna loved reading as a child. In an interview with Elle, she explained that reading was her way of escaping the atrocities of the civil war.

In Atlanta, she attended Spelman College, a private historically black women's liberal arts college, where she spent time as a student of Nawal El Saadawi who would provide inspiration for The Gilded Ones, Forna's pioneering feminist fantasy novel. After obtaining her Bachelor of Arts degree at Spelman, Forna moved to Los Angeles, California, where she attended the USC School of Cinematic Arts, from which she earned a Master of Fine Arts degree in film and TV production.

Career
Writing in The Guardian in 2021, Forna said that her father and grandmother were the ones to inspire her to become an author. As a child she heard them tell stories about strong women, such as Mami Wata, the goddess of water, and the Dahomey Amazons. She later found that western literature lacked black female heroes, and she was driven to change this.

Forna became the first Sierra Leonean American to land a book deal with a major publisher for a young adult fantasy novel. Among the positive critical attention received by The Gilded Ones, published in 2021, a review in Publishers Weekly noted: "Formidable heroines and a thoughtful feminist mythology distinguish debut author Forna's West Africa-inspired fantasy trilogy launch. Abundant action drives the pace, while a nuanced plot advocates social change by illustrating the myriad ways in which society cages and commodifies women." A week after the 2021 release of The Gilded Ones, it was announced in Deadline Hollywood that the independent film production company Makeready had signed Forna to write the script for a film adaptation.

Personal life
Namina Forna is daughter of the Honorable A. G. Sembu Forna, a noted Sierra Leonean politician, and her mother is Ambassador and former Sierra Leone deputy minister of foreign affairs, Ebun Strasser-King.

Bibliography

The Deathless series 
 The Gilded Ones (9 February 2021), 
 The Merciless Ones (31 May 2022),

References

External links
Author's website

1987 births
21st-century American novelists
21st-century American women writers
21st-century Sierra Leonean writers
American fantasy writers
American women novelists
Black speculative fiction authors
Living people
Sierra Leonean women writers
Women science fiction and fantasy writers